Diplognathodus is an extinct genus of conodonts in the family Anchignathodontidae. Specimens are found in Carboniferous and Permian formations.

The genus Sweetognathus originated in the earliest Permian as S. expansus from Diplognathodus edentulus.

Diplognathodus ellesmerensis has been proposed as a marker of the Moscovian, in the Pennsylvanian age of the Carboniferous.

References 

 Hindeodus, Diplognathodus, and Ellisonia Revisited—An Identity Crisis in Permian Conodonts. PH Von Bitter and GK Merrill, Geologica et Palaeontologica, 1985
 Effects of variation on the speciation and phylogeny of Diplognathodus. PH Von Bitter and GK Merrill, Cour. Forsch.-Inst. Senckenberg, 1990

External links 

 
 

Ozarkodinida genera
Carboniferous conodonts
Permian conodonts
Permian genus extinctions
Permian extinctions
Fossil taxa described in 1975